is a private university in Toyonaka, Osaka, Japan. The predecessor of the school was founded in 1915, and it was chartered as a university in 1958.

Undergraduate majors
This college has following undergraduate majors

 Music Business
 Composition
 Music Creation
 Music Communication
 Vocal
 Piano
 Piano Course
 Piano Instruction Course
 Piano Performance Special Course
 Pipe Organ

 Wind Instruments
 String Instrument
 String Instrument Course
 Violin Performance Special Course
 Percussion
 Classic Guitar/Mandolin Performance
 Japanese Music
 Jazz
 Electronic Organ
 Vocal Performance
 Popular Instrument

Graduate school
This college has following postgraduate majors

 Composition Major
 Composition Research Room
 Musicology Research Room
 Vocal Performance Major
 Opera Research Room
 Song Research Room
 Instrumental Music Major
 Piano Research Room
 Wind, String and Percussion Instruments Research Room

Notable alumni
Singer Aiko Yanai studied here in 1995 along with Ringo Shiina. 

Composer Yoko Shimomura graduated from this university in 1988.

Conductor Tomomi Nishimoto graduated from this university in 1994.

References

External links
 

Toyonaka, Osaka
Universities and colleges in Osaka Prefecture
Private universities and colleges in Japan
Music schools in Japan
Educational institutions established in 1915
1915 establishments in Japan